Aghdash (also Romanized as Āghdāsh; also known as Āqdāsh, Āshākhī Kezen, Kezen, Kezen-e Pā’īn, Kezen Pā’īn, and Najafābād) is a village in Vardasht Rural District, in the Central District of Semirom County, Isfahan Province, Iran. At the 2006 census, its population was 168, in 48 families.

References 

Populated places in Semirom County